Rashk may refer to:
 Rashk-e Olya, Fars, Fars Province
 Rashk-e Sofla, Fars, Fars Province
 Rashk, Hormozgan
 Rashk-e Olya, Kerman, Kerman Province
 Rashk-e Sofla, Kerman, Kerman Province
 Rashk-e Vosta, Kerman Province
 Rashk, Khuzestan
 Rashk, Sistan and Baluchestan

See also
 Rashg (disambiguation)